Reginald Donald Whittington (born January 23, 1946) is an American former racing driver from Lubbock, Texas, who won the 1979 24 Hours of Le Mans together with his brother Bill Whittington and Klaus Ludwig in a Porsche 935, although Ludwig, a multiple winner at Le Mans and elsewhere, did most of the driving in the heavy rain as the brothers did not have any real racing experience prior to the late 1970s. Don's brother Dale also competed in open wheel racing. His father, Don Whittington, Sr. was also an American racing driver in the USAC National Championship from 1957 to 1959.

Racing career
Whittington also raced in five Indianapolis 500s, with a best finish of sixth. He also made ten NASCAR Winston Cup starts in 1980 and 1981. He earned a top-ten in the sport in his debut at Riverside. He also participated in the 1980 International Race of Champions.

In 1979, the brothers purchased and operated the Road Atlanta road-racing circuit, reportedly utilizing the secluded backstretch of the course as a landing strip for aircraft.

In 1984, Don's brother Bill co-owned, with Randy Lanier and Marty Hinze, the Blue Thunder Racing Team. Don raced for the team on occasion.

Between 1976 and 1995, they raced four different P-51 Mustangs (including a rare H model and a Rolls-Royce Griffon powered P-51XR), an F8F Bearcat and a P-63 King Cobra. While they never scored a victory, Don in Precious Metal earned three podium finishes and was top qualifier twice.

The brothers were heavily involved in the 1970s 'warbird' movement, and participated in preservation groups like the Confederate Air Force and Valiant Air Command. They restored numerous aircraft over the years, including an FG-1D Corsair, HA-1112 (Spanish-built Bf 109), several P-51 Mustangs, and two B-17 Flying Fortresses (including a rare B-17E recovered in Bolivia).

In 1986, Don Whittington pleaded guilty to money laundering charges in association with his brother Bill's guilty plea to income tax evasion and conspiracy to smuggle marijuana into the United States from Colombia. Don Whittington received an 18-month prison sentence. Along with Randy Lanier, John Paul Sr. and John Paul Jr., the Whittington brothers were part of the IMSA drug smuggling scandal of the 1980s, where a number of drivers financed their racing activities with the proceeds from drug smuggling.

In 2009, Whittington sued the Indianapolis Motor Speedway Foundation over possession of the 1979 24 Hours of Le Mans winning Porsche 935. The car was given to the Speedway's museum in the early 1980s. Whittington claimed it was a loan and wanted to reclaim possession. The Speedway maintained it was a donation. On April 13, 2010, the United States Court of Appeals for the Seventh Circuit sided with the museum and found the evidence pointed to the car being a donation.

Currently, Whittington owns World Jet, a fixed-base operator at the Ft. Lauderdale Executive Airport.

Motorsports career results

Complete 24 Hours of Le Mans results

American open-wheel racing
(key) (Races in bold indicate pole position)

CART PPG Indy Car World Series

Indianapolis 500

NASCAR
(key) (Bold – Pole position awarded by qualifying time. Italics – Pole position earned by points standings or practice time. * – Most laps led.)

Winston Cup Series

Daytona 500

Winston West Series

International Race of Champions
(key) (Bold – Pole position. * – Most laps led.)

References

External links
NASCAR and IROC stats from Racing-Reference.info
RARA stats from airrace.org
World Jet 

1946 births
24 Hours of Le Mans drivers
24 Hours of Le Mans winning drivers
American Le Mans Series drivers
Indianapolis 500 drivers
International Race of Champions drivers
Living people
NASCAR drivers
Sportspeople from Lubbock, Texas
Racing drivers from Texas
Trans-Am Series drivers
World Sportscar Championship drivers
Auto racing controversies
A. J. Foyt Enterprises drivers